Sport name(), real name Genevieve ( born February 1970 year, Varna, Bulgaria) is a Bulgarian biathlete. She took up the biathlon in 1992. She made the national team in 1993 and came in 29th in the 15-kilometer competition at the Lillehammer Olympics the following year.  She won a gold Olympic medal at the 15 km Individual event during the 1998 Winter Olympics in Nagano. , her gold medal is the only one won by a Bulgarian at a Winter Olympic games.

Dafovska is an administrator from Chepelare.

Achievements
1995 – Bronze in the World Championship in Media:Antholz-Anterselva, Italy
1997 – Bronze in the World Championship in Brezno-Osrblie, Slovakia
1998 – Gold in the Olympic games in Nagano, Japan
2002 – Fifth place in the Olympic Games in Salt Lake City, USA
2004 – Gold in the European Championship in Minsk, Belarus
2006 – 8th in the Olympic games in Torino, Italy

References

1975 births
Living people
Bulgarian female biathletes
Olympic biathletes of Bulgaria
Olympic gold medalists for Bulgaria
Biathletes at the 1998 Winter Olympics
Biathletes at the 2002 Winter Olympics
Biathletes at the 2006 Winter Olympics
Olympic medalists in biathlon
Biathlon World Championships medalists
Medalists at the 1998 Winter Olympics
People from Chepelare
21st-century Bulgarian women